Les beaux jours de Shehrazade (English: The Beautiful Days of Sheherazade, Arabic: Ayyaam Chahrazad al-Hilwa) is 1982 Moroccan film directed by Mostafa Derkaoui. It was screened at the 1st Moroccan National Film Festival held in Rabat.

Synopsis 
A team of filmmakers is faced with the challenge of choosing a subject to film. After a lengthy discussion, they end up settling with the story of a cabaret singer.

Cast 

 Abdelwahab Doukali
 Naïma Lamcharki
 Mariam Fakhr Eddine
 Farid Belkahia

References 

1982 films
Moroccan drama films